Brachyurophis approximans, also known as the north-western shovel-nosed snake, is a species of venomous burrowing snake that is endemic to Australia. The specific epithet approximans (“approaching”) alludes to its similarity to Brachyurophis campbelli.

Description
The species grows to about 30 cm in length. There are some 50–80 dark brown bands along the body, much broader than the pale bands separating them. The belly is whitish.

Behaviour
The species is oviparous, with a clutch size of three. It feeds on reptile eggs.

Distribution and habitat
The species occurs in the arid Pilbara and adjacent areas of north-west Western Australia, in stony soils vegetated with Acacia. The type locality is Muccan Station in the Pilbara.

References

 
approximans
Snakes of Australia
Endemic fauna of Australia
Reptiles of Western Australia
Taxa named by Ludwig Glauert
Reptiles described in 1954